Biokinetics may refer to:

Science
 Pharmacokinetics, the study of the metabolism and transport of drugs through the body
 Toxicokinetics, the study of the metabolism and transport of toxins through the body
 Biomechanics, the study of physical motions of the body

Music
 Biokinetics (Porter Ricks album)